The Canadian English Language Proficiency Index Program, or CELPIP, is an English language assessment tool which measures listening, reading, writing, and speaking skills. The test is administered by Paragon Testing Enterprises., a subsidiary of the University of British Columbia (UBC). Paragon is the only Canadian company delivering Immigration, Refugees and Citizenship Canada (IRCC) designated English proficiency tests. The CELPIP test is offered in two versions, CELPIP-General, and CELPIP-General LS.

CELPIP-General is suitable for people who need proof of English-language skills when applying for permanent resident status in Canada under the Federal Skilled Worker Program (FSWP), Federal Skilled Trades Program (FSTP), Canadian Experience Class (CEC), Start-up Visa Program, and various Provincial Nominee Programs, or for employment. Immigration, Refugees and Citizenship Canada has two approved English language tests: CELPIP-General and IELTS General Training Test: International English Language Testing System.

CELPIP-General LS is suitable for people who need proof of listening and speaking proficiency for Canadian citizenship. The CELPIP-General LS Test is accepted by IRCC as one of only two designated English language for Canadian citizenship.

In June 2015, with the acquisition of the Canadian Academic English Language (CAEL) Assessment, Paragon Testing Enterprises retired the CELPIP-Academic Test.

CELPIP Test Types

CELPIP-General 
The CELPIP-General Test assesses a general level of English-language proficiency. The CELPIP-General Test is accepted as proof of English language proficiency for those applying for Canadian Permanent Residency and to the Association of Saskatchewan REALTORS (ASR).

CELPIP-General LS 
The CELPIP-General LS Test assesses a general level of English-language proficiency. The CELPIP-General LS Test is accepted by Immigration, Refugees and Citizenship Canada (IRCC) as a measure of listening and speaking proficiency for those applying for Canadian citizenship.

In June 2015, Immigration, Refugees and Citizenship Canada (IRCC) implemented the remaining changes to the Citizenship Act. One important change is that applicants between the ages of 14 and 64 must now meet basic language requirements in listening and speaking in English or French. For minors who are between the ages of 14 and 17, registrations for the CELPIP-General LS Test are accepted.

Test Format

CELPIP-General 
The test is completely computer-delivered, and consists of four sections: listening, reading, and writing and speaking. The Listening component is composed of eight parts, but only seven parts will be given during the test. The test taker will not be informed which part is to be omitted.The unscored items in the Reading and Listening section are used for test development. These unscored items can be found anywhere within the component and the test taker will not know which items will be unscored. The total length of all four sections is 180 minutes.

CELPIP-General LS 
The test is computer-based, and made up of two sections: listening and speaking. The Listening component is composed of eight Listening parts, but only seven parts will be given during the test. The test taker will not be informed which part is to be omitted.

The total length of all two sections is 67 minutes.

Scoring 

Scores are released 8 business days online after the test taker's test date. Two hard copies of the Official CELPIP Score Report are then sent out with Canada Post Regular Mail.

Express Rating scores are released in the test taker's CELPIP account 3 business days after their test date. Express Rating is available, with an extra fee, for the CELPIP-General Test and the CELPIP-General LS Test. Hardcopies of the CELPIP Official Score Report are sent through Canada Post Express Post 

The format and scoring of the CELPIP-General Test and the CELPIP-General LS Test are referenced to the Canadian Language Benchmarks (CLB). Below are the proficiency score levels and their CLB equivalents:

Unlike on the IELTS, there are no half-band scores allotted. Band scores are only reported in increments of 1.

Test Centre Locations
There are over 33 testing centres across Canada in addition to one test center in United Arab Emirates. However, CELPIP Test sittings are currently only available in Canada and United Arab Emirates, Dubai,India.

Exam Preparation Resources
One can prepare for the exam by taking free sample tests available through CELPIP's online portal. Alternatively, Paragon provides an opportunity to take a sample test in a real testing centre environment to all prospective test-takers. Among other resources, Paragon produces a wide selection of study materials for each module of the test and also conducts CELPIP Speaking Pro sessions online.

See also
CAEL (Canadian Academic English Language Assessment)
IRCC (Immigration, Refugees and Citizenship Canada)
TOEIC (Test of English for International Communication)
TOEFL (Test of English as a Foreign Language)
IELTS (International English Language Testing System)

Notes

References
 "Becoming an Immigration Consultant." Immigration Consultants of Canada Regulatory Council. Web. 25 May 2012
 "Skilled Workers and Professionals - Selection Factor: Language." Citizenship and Immigration Canada. 23 Oct. 2010. Web. 25 May 2012
 "English Proficiency Requirements." English Language Proficiency Requirements. The University of British Columbia. Web. 29 May 2012
 "Canadian English Language Proficiency Index Program (CELPIP)." Citizenship and Immigration Canada. Citizenship and Immigration Canada, 20 Jan. 2009. Web. 29 May 2012
 "Test Format and Scoring." CELPIP Test - Academic. Paragon Testing Enterprises. Web. 29 May 2012
 "Test Format and Scoring." CELPIP Test - General. Paragon Testing Enterprises. Web. 29 May 2012
 "About Paragon." Paragon Testing Enterprises. Web. 25 May 2012

External links
 
 
 
 
 
 UBC (University of British Columbia)
 IRCC (Immigration, Refugees and Citizenship Canada)

English language tests
Education in Canada